Clarissa Marie Robles Quezada (born 9 May 1994) is a former US-born Mexican footballer who played as right back. She has been a member of the Mexico women's national team.

Club career
In July 2017, Robles was about to sign for Tigres UANL, but the rule of Liga MX Femenil at the time only allowed Mexican-born players to compete.

International career
Robles represented Mexico at the 2014 FIFA U-20 Women's World Cup. She made her senior debut on 4 February 2017 in a friendly match against Canada.

References

External links

1994 births
Living people
Citizens of Mexico through descent
Mexican women's footballers
Mexico women's international footballers
People from Corona, California
American sportspeople of Mexican descent
American women's soccer players
Soccer players from California
Women's association football fullbacks
Women's association football forwards
Women's association football midfielders
UC Irvine Anteaters women's soccer players